Shiraz Golden Restaurant or Shiraz is a restaurant located at Park Street, Kolkata, India. This was the first restaurant to serve Mughlai cuisine in Kolkata. In 2016, the restaurant completed 75 years. Shiraz has several outlets across the country.

History 
Shiraz was founded in 1941. In 1972 Shamshuddin Bawarchi joined the restaurant as a cook, and introduced new recipes of preparing biryani. One of the ancestors of Shamsuddin was a cook of Wajid Ali Shah.

References 

Restaurants in Kolkata
Companies based in Kolkata
Indian companies established in 1941